Tulio Antonio Febres-Cordero Troconis (May 31, 1860 – June 3, 1938) was a Venezuelan writer, historian, university professor and journalist. 

As a topographer, he developed the technique imagotipia (1885), or art to represent images with typefaces. He taught "Universal history" at the University of the Andes and made a fundamental contribution to the intellectual culture of Venezuela, by studying the history of Mérida.

References

1869 births
1938 deaths
People from Mérida, Mérida
Topographers
Academic staff of the University of the Andes (Venezuela)
20th-century Venezuelan historians
Venezuelan journalists
Venezuelan male writers
19th-century Venezuelan historians